Christopher Stephen McDermott  (born 4 November 1963) is a former professional Australian rules footballer who played for the Adelaide Football Club in the Australian Football League (AFL), and the Glenelg Football Club and North Adelaide Football Club in the South Australian National Football League (SANFL).

He was an inaugural inductee into the South Australian Football Hall of Fame in 2002.

Playing career
He was initially signed by the VFL team Fitzroy in 1981, but stayed in the SANFL with Glenelg after the South Australian player retention scheme was developed to pay top players to remain in South Australia.

He was also chased by Carlton, and eventually drafted by Brisbane in 1986, but still did not make his VFL debut. He ultimately played 227 premiership games and 49 pre-season/night series matches for Glenelg.

In 1990, with talks of Port Adelaide becoming the South Australian team in the national competition, that McDermott looked to Victoria for another club. However, when it became clear that the Adelaide Crows were going to be South Australia's entry into the AFL, he remained in his home state and became the inaugural captain of the Crows.

McDermott is commonly referred to as "Bone", a nickname referring to the damage done to his nose due to excessive facial trauma experienced whilst playing in both the SANFL and AFL.

Coaching career
McDermott served as playing coach for North Adelaide in 1997, playing ten games for the club, and then as non-playing coach from 1998 to 2000.

Other matches and records

At the time of his retirement, McDermott's career total of 354 premiership matches was ranked fourth in South Australian elite football behind Glenelg teammate Peter Carey (423), Russell Ebert (373) and longtime coach Graham Cornes (361): as of 2022, he is ranked sixth behind them, as well as Tyson Edwards and Andrew McLeod (both 363).

McDermott also played 14 State of Origin matches for South Australia and a total of 61 pre-season/night series matches, 49 for Glenelg and 12 for Adelaide (these are counted as senior by the SANFL but not the VFL/AFL). If these are included, McDermott played a total of 429 senior career games.

The VFL/AFL lists McDermott's total as 417, excluding his pre-season/night series matches for Adelaide. Depending on the viewpoint taken, his total career senior games ranks either ninth (using the AFL's total) or tenth (using his overall total) in elite Australian rules football, and ranks either third behind Carey (467) and Ebert (421) or second behind Carey in South Australian elite football.

Post football
McDermott set up the McGuinness-McDermott Foundation, which raises funds to provide oncology treatment for South Australian children, with fellow former Crows team-mate Tony McGuinness.

In July 2014 McDermott became a football and sports commentator for Adelaide talkback radio station FIVEaa and hosted the station's weekday drive-time sports show with another former Adelaide Crows player, Stephen Rowe.  In November 2014 McDermott was replaced on FIVEaa by former Adelaide Crows dual premiership captain, Mark Bickley.

Personal life
Australian stand up comedian and host of the Channel 10 program Good News Week, Paul McDermott is his first cousin. His grandfather was Les Dayman, an inductee into the SANFL Hall of Fame.

References

External links

Adelaide Football Club players
Malcolm Blight Medal winners
1963 births
Living people
Glenelg Football Club players
North Adelaide Football Club players
North Adelaide Football Club coaches
South Australian State of Origin players
All-Australians (1953–1988)
Australian rules footballers from South Australia
All-Australians (AFL)
South Australian Football Hall of Fame inductees